Ajawaan Lake is a lake in the northern boreal forest portion of Prince Albert National Park in the Canadian province of Saskatchewan,  from the north end of Kingsmere Lake via a wide portage trail. It is known mainly as the home of Grey Owl, famed naturalist, from 1932 to 1938. Access is via a  trail from the Kingsmere River up the west side of Kingsmere Lake, or by canoe or small boat via the Kingsmere River, Kingsmere River rail push-cart portage and Kingsmere Lake. The lake has native northern pike and walleye fish, as well as resident beavers.

The trail to Grey Owl's cabin is  around the western edge of the lake. There are two cabins on the north shore, one at the water's edge where beavers had built a lodge partly inside, and a second up the hill behind. The second cabin was built for Grey Owl's wife, Anahareo, who disliked sharing the cabin with beavers. The graves of Grey Owl, Anahereo, and their daughter Shirley Dawn are west of the upper cabin. There are interpretative signs  at the cabin site. Parks Canada has restored both the cabins several times and the beaver lodge in the lower cabin is a partial reconstruction only.

Gallery

See also 
 List of lakes of Saskatchewan

References

External links 
 Parks Canada - Grey Owl
 Hiking to Ajawaan

Lakes of Saskatchewan
Prince Albert National Park